The Centro de Convenciones y Polyforum Chiapas, also known as Poliforum Mesoamericano, is a 3,875-seat indoor arena located in Tuxtla Gutiérrez, Mexico. It was built in 1994. It is used for concerts, basketball, lucha libre, conventions and other special events.

The Polyforum contains  of total space. Unlike most arenas built in the 1990s, the Polyforum contains a permanent stage allowing it to also be used for stage shows. Seating is divided between permanent seats on the risers and removable floor seating

There are also three meeting rooms, a 100-seat auditorium, an on-site restaurant, and various high-rise buildings with governmental offices.

External links

 
Tuxtla Gutiérrez Guide to Trade Exhibition Venues

Convention centers in Mexico
Music venues in Mexico
Sports venues in Tuxtla Gutiérrez
Tuxtla Gutiérrez